The Ehrenburg (Honour Castle) is a castle overlooking the city of Plaue in Thuringia (Germany).

History
 The burg was constructed in 1324 by the Grafen von Schwarzburg.
 By the 16th century the burg was no longer in use and began to decay.
 In 1856 the first restoration of the walls began.
 In 1912 the Burg was sold and converted into an inn.
 Today it is a private residence.

Plan
The building consists of a central tower surrounded by a defensive wall.

Further reading
 Georg Dehio: Handbuch der deutschen Kunstdenkmäler, Ausgabe für Thüringen. Deutscher Kunstverlag, München 2003, .

Castles in Thuringia
Buildings and structures in Ilm-Kreis